The Buick Model B was Buick's first model as an independent company, later becoming part of General Motors in 1908. It was built in Jackson, Michigan. A model B was exhibited in 1905 at the New York Auto Show as a promotion of the model C which would be the same. William C. Durant introduced the car himself at the exhibit, and took new car orders at the car show, raising sales from 37 cars in 1904 to 750 in 1905. It had a 2-cylinder, horizontally opposed engine – the world's first production OHV (overhead valve) engine – installed lengthwise within the frame, had a planetary transmission, with a cone clutch and two forward speeds and one reverse gear. The engine was rated at 21 bhp. In later years, it was renamed as improvements were made. The chassis was shared later with the Oldsmobile Model 20 when they became a division of GM while the overhead valve engine wasn't used by Oldsmobile. It had a retail price of US$950 ($ in  dollars ) for the touring sedan.

The Model B / C continued to be made, as model F, G, and 14, but was dropped after 1911 as Buick had been promoting 4 cylinder cars, starting with the D in 1907.

 Model B (1903-04)
 Model C (1905)
 Model F & G (1906–1910)
 Model 14 & 14B (1910–1911)

References 

Buick vehicles
Cars powered by boxer engines
First car made by manufacturer